Afzelia xylocarpa is a tree from Southeast Asia. It grows in Thailand, Vietnam, Cambodia, Laos and Burma in deciduous forests.  It can reach 30 metres tall with a trunk up to 2 metres in diameter in a mature specimen.

Uses
The seeds are harvested for medicinal purposes. The seed pulp can be used to make cigarettes, and the bark and seed are used for herbal medicine. The highly figured lumber is often sold as Afzelia Xylay. The wood is used for ornamental woodturning, pens, knife handles, carvings, and musical instruments.

In Cambodia, A. xylocarpa (locally known as Beng) are planted as shading trees due to its wide-ranging branches. At roadsides and waterways the tree provides a good windbarrier and protection from water-driven soil erosion.

Names
The tree has different local names:
 Khmer: បេង  
 Laotian: ຄ່າ 
 Mandarin Chinese: 缅茄 (pinyin: miǎnqié)
 Vietnamese: Gõ đỏ.

References

External links

xylocarpa
Flora of Indo-China
Endangered plants
Decorative fruits and seeds
Fabales of Asia